Āsava is a Pali term (Sanskrit: Āsrava) that is used in Buddhist scripture, philosophy, and psychology, meaning "influx, canker." It refers to the mental defilements of sensual pleasures, craving for existence, and ignorance, which perpetuate samsara, the beginningless cycle of rebirth, dukkha, and dying again.

Asavas are also translated as "karmic predilections" and "karmic propensities" in Buddhism. The term is also common in Jainist literature, and sometimes appears equivalently as Asrava or Anhaya. However, Buddhism rejects the karma and asava theories of Jainism, and presents a different version instead.

Etymology
According to Bhikkhu Bodhi,

Ajahn Sucitto in his book 'Kamma and the end of Kamma' describes asavas as "underlying biases" (that fabricate things, emotions, sensations, and responses), which condition grasping through which samsara operates.

Meaning

Samsara

The āsavas are mental defilements that perpetuate samsara, the beginningless cycle of rebirth, dukkha, and dying again. Carr and Mahalingam:
{{quote|inflow, influx, influence; mental bias or canker, cankers that keep one bound to the world of samsāra; used particularly in Jainism and Buddhism.}}

Bhikkhu Bodhi:

De Silva further explains:
The word canker suggests something that corrodes or corrupts slowly. These figurative meanings perhaps describe facets of the concept of āsava: kept long in storage, oozing out, taint, corroding, etc.

Number of āsavas
Some Pali canons mention three āsava that sustain karmic flow. These three mentioned in the Nikāyas are "karmic propensities for sensual pleasures (kāmāsava), karmic propensities for existence (bhavāsava), and karmic propensities for ignorance (avijjāsava)".

Other Pali texts mention four āsava, adding diṭṭhāsava or "karmic propensities for a viewpoint or perspective".

In either case, these texts assert that the complete destruction of all these asavas is synonymous with complete Awakening.

Liberation
According to Rhys Davids & Stede (1921–25), "Freedom from the 'Āsavas' constitutes Arahantship." According to Bhikkhu Bodhi,

Textual appearance
Sarvepalli Radhakrishnan, in his translation of the Dhammapada, notes that the word "asava" appears in the Dhammapada'' in verses 93, 226, 253, 292, and 293. Verse 226 (chapter 17, verse 6) has been translated by Acharya Buddharakkhita as follows:

Notes

References

Sources

External links 

Buddhist philosophical concepts